L'incroyable Vérité is the debut album of Sébastien Tellier, released in 2001. The music was written by Tellier with lyrics by Mathieu Tonetti and Tellier. With material from the album, Tellier joined the band Air in their United States tour in the summer of 2001. The song "Universe" from the album is featured in the film Daft Punk's Electroma and the song "Fantino" appears in the film Lost in Translation. L'incroyable Vérité received positive reviews upon release.

L'incroyable Vérité is a pop album featuring styles from lo-fi electronica to bizarre cabaret tunes. Its sleeve featured Tellier in full evening dress on the front, while the back of jacket had a shot of him cavorting in a playboy's pool. He instructed listeners only to listen to the album by candlelight.

Track listing
 "Oh malheur chez O'Malley"
 "Kazoo III"
"Universe"
 Trilogie chien: "L'enfance d'un chien"
 Trilogie chien: "Une vie de papa"
 Trilogie chien: "Fin chien"
 "Grec"
 "Kissed by you"
 "Fantino"
 "Trilogie femme"
 Vierges
 Une vraie maman
 Face au miroir
 "Black douleur"

External links

[ L'incroyable Vérité] at Allmusic
Review at NME.com
Review at bostonphoenix.com

2001 debut albums
Sébastien Tellier albums